"The Man Who Had No Idea" is a 1978 science fiction story by Thomas M. Disch. It was first published in The Magazine of Fantasy and Science Fiction.

Plot summary
In a world where licenses are required in order to participate in conversation, Barry Riordan risks failing his exam because he cannot think of anything original.

Reception
"The Man Who Had No Idea" was a finalist for the 1979 Hugo Award for Best Novelette

John Sladek considered it to depict "delightful problems". Kirkus Reviews noted that it "say(s) a great deal about our expectations of ourselves and others." John Clute, however, found it to be "unaccountably genial and without formal bite", such that its "potentially formidable idea gradually declines into doodle".

Origins

In a 1984 interview, Disch described it as "a story about what our social relationships are really like" and "a springboard to the subject of what do we talk about when we talk about anything. What are all these social interactions about? What is the subject of them?"

References

1978 short stories
Works by Thomas M. Disch
Works originally published in The Magazine of Fantasy & Science Fiction